ZHSS may refer to:

Zhonghua Secondary School, a secondary school in Serangoon, Singapore
ZHSS, the ICAO airport code for Shashi Airport, a defunct airport in Hubei Province, China